Charles Louis Upton (September 10, 1870 – May 25, 1936) was an American physician and college football coach.  He was the fourth head football coach at Vanderbilt University, serving for one season, in 1895, and compiling a record of 5–3–1.  Upton was born on September 10, 1870, in Shelburne Falls, Massachusetts.  He graduated from Amherst College and received a medical degree from the University of Pennsylvania.  Upton practiced medicine in Massachusetts.  He died at his home in Greenfield, Massachusetts, on May 25, 1936.

Head coaching record

References

External links
  

1870 births
1936 deaths
American physicians
Vanderbilt Commodores football coaches
Amherst College alumni
Perelman School of Medicine at the University of Pennsylvania alumni
People from Shelburne Falls, Massachusetts